The Galápagos Islands are located off the west coast of South America straddling the equator. The Galápagos are located at the confluence of several currents including the cold Humboldt Current traveling north from South America and the Panama Current traveling south from Central America make the islands cooler and provide the perfect environment for the unique mix of wildlife that inhabits the islands.

These islands are volcanic in origin and were never attached to any continent. Galapagos wildlife arrived here in one of three ways: flying, floating or swimming.  Where in most environments larger mammals are normally the predators at the top of the food chain, these animals were unable to survive the journey.  Thus the giant Galápagos tortoise became the largest land animal on the islands, and due to the lack of natural predators, the wildlife in the Galápagos is known for being extremely tame without instinctual fear.
  
The Galápagos Islands are noted as a home to a large number of endemic species. The stark rocky islands (many with few plants) made it necessary for many species need to adapt to survive here and by doing so evolving into new endemic species. It was after visiting the Galápagos and studying the endemic wildlife that inhabit the islands that a young Charles Darwin developed his theory of evolution.

Fauna

One of the best-known is the Galápagos tortoise, which lives on seven of the islands. It has an average lifespan of more than 150 years.

The marine iguana is also extremely unusual, since it is the only iguana adapted to life in the sea. Land iguanas, lava lizards, geckos and harmless snakes can also be found in the islands. The large number and range of birds is also of interest to scientists and tourists. Around 56 species live in the archipelago, of which 27 are found only in the Galápagos. Some of these are found only on one island.

The most outstanding are penguins, which live on the colder coasts, Darwin's finches, frigatebirds, albatrosses, gulls, boobies, pelicans and Galápagos hawks, among others. The flightless cormorant, a peculiar bird which has lost the ability to fly, and the Galapagos crake, nearly flightless, are also part of this rich fauna.

On the other hand, there are many mammal species, mostly sea mammals such as whales, dolphins and sea lions.  A few species of endemic Galapagos mice (or rice rats) - the Santiago Galapagos mouse and the Fernandina Galapagos mouse - have been recently rediscovered.

Charles darwin was the one who discovered over 100 new species of birds on the island.

Flora
On the larger Galápagos Islands, four ecological zones have been defined: coastal, low or dry, transitional and humid. In the first, species such as myrtle, mangrove and saltbush can be found. In the second grow cactus, the Bursera graveolens (the incensé tree), carob tree, Manchineel (the poison apple tree), chala and yellow cordia, among others. In the transitional zone taller trees, epiphytes and perennial herbs can be seen. The best known varieties are the cat's claw, espuela de gallo. In the humid sector are the cogojo, Galapagos guava, cat's claw, Galapagos coffee, passionflower and some types of moss, ferns and fungus.

Invasive species
An invasive species is an alien organism that is not native to a habitat and introduced to a new area that wreaks havoc on the ecosystem, infrastructure and economy. These species can be introduced via natural events or more commonly, through human interactions like colonization, tourism, and the releasing of exotic pets. There are approximately over 1,300 total invasive species within the Galapagos Islands consisting of over 500 insects, over 750 plants and over 30 vertebrates. Most of the plants were brought for agricultural and aesthetic reasons. The Galapagos Islands are highly susceptible to the introduction of foreign species. The islands are credited with being Ecuador’s most prized feature because they are well-known for their intense biodiversity. Scientists who study the flora and fauna in the Galapagos agree that the increasing amount of invasive species in the region is  “the single greatest threat to the terrestrial ecosystems”. The islands are specifically vulnerable because of their geographic location away from the mainland Ecuador. This distance separates the existing species in the Galapagos from their counterparts on the mainland, therefore when foreign species invade the islands, they can easily proliferate until they are the majority. 

Feral goats were introduced by humans to the islands for agricultural reasons have had a huge impact on the ecosystem. Feral goats are dangerous to the environment because they eat everything in sight, destroying many habitats. These goats do not have natural predators, thus their population continues to grow which leads to a decrease in other organisms they prey on. The goats have had a huge impact on a specific species on the island, the Galapagos tortoise. The goats would eat all of the food and resources needed by the tortoises, eventually driving the tortoises towards extinction.

Fixing the problems of the invasive species in the Galapagos is not easy as it is very expensive and takes a long time to rid an island of an invasive species. There are many organizations that dedicate themselves to help keep invasive species out of the Galapagos and help eradicate them as well like the Charles Darwin Foundation who helped create the Galapagos Inspection and Quarantine System (SICGAL) that checks the luggage brought into the Galapagos Islands for animals and plants that could be released onto the island. Another example of a proposed solution is Project Isabela Project Isabela which was proposed to rid the island of the feral goats before they caused any extreme damage to the island and the animals living on it. This proposition was very gruesome due to the large massacre of goats which left large amounts of dead goats on the ground for everyone to see. They left the slaughtered goats on the ground so that the nutrients from the goats would be put back into the ecosystem. Other invasive species that were successfully eradicated were fire ants, rock pigeons, cats and a species of blackberry bush. Scientists have also suggested the release of natural enemies to control population growth amongst the invasive species.

References

External links 

 Birding Site Guide provides birders with free, where to watch birds information worldwide

 
Fauna of Ecuador
Flora of the Galápagos Islands
Biota of archipelagoes